Xmulzencab are a group of Maya bee deities.

References 

Maya gods
Animal gods